The simple-station Calle 45 is part of the TransMilenio mass-transit system of Bogotá, Colombia, opened in year 2000.

Location

The station is located north of downtown Bogotá, specifically on Avenida Caracas, between Calles 42 and 45.

History

In 2000, phase one of the TransMilenio system was opened between Portal de la 80 and Tercer Milenio, including this station.

The station is named Calle 45 because of its proximity to the street of that name. The service covers the demands of the students who attend the Universidad Distrital Francisco José de Caldas, Universidad Piloto and Universidad Javeriana. It also serves the neighborhoods of Palermo, Sucre, Santa Teresita, and Clinica Nueva.

On March 9, 2012, protests lodged by mostly young children in groups of up to 200, blocked in several times and up to 3 hours in the trunk stations Caracas. The protests left destroyed and sacked this season of the system.

Station services

Old trunk services

Main Line Service

Feeder routes

This station does not have connections to feeder routes.

Inter-city service

This station does not have inter-city service.

See also
Bogotá
TransMilenio
List of TransMilenio Stations

External links
TransMilenio
suRumbo.com

TransMilenio